Yelena Migunova (born 4 January 1984 in Kazan) is a Russian sprint athlete.

She won the silver medal in the 4 × 400 m relay at the 2008 Summer Olympics.  Her teammates included Natalya Nazarova and Tatyana Levina

References

External links
Athlete bio at 2008 Olympics website

1984 births
Living people
Russian female sprinters
Olympic athletes of Russia
Athletes (track and field) at the 2008 Summer Olympics
Olympic silver medalists for Russia
Sportspeople from Kazan
Medalists at the 2008 Summer Olympics
Universiade medalists in athletics (track and field)
Universiade gold medalists for Russia
Universiade silver medalists for Russia
Medalists at the 2011 Summer Universiade
Medalists at the 2005 Summer Universiade
21st-century Russian women